All lists of cricket records are listed here:

General cricket records
 List of First-class cricket records 
 List of Test cricket records
 List of List A cricket records
 List of One Day International cricket records
 List of Twenty20 cricket records
 List of Twenty20 International records
 List of Cricket World Cup records
 List of Ranji Trophy records
 List of women's Test cricket records
 List of women's One Day International cricket records
 List of women's Twenty20 International records
List of players who hit six sixes in an over

List of records concerning county cricket
Records for first-class counties within the England and Wales Cricket Board area are listed below.

List of records by country
 List of Afghanistan One Day International cricket records
 List of Afghanistan Test cricket records
 List of Afghanistan Twenty20 International cricket records
 List of Australia One Day International cricket records
 List of Australia Test cricket records
 List of Australia Twenty20 International cricket records
 List of Bangladesh One Day International cricket records
 List of Bangladesh Test cricket records
 List of Bangladesh Twenty20 International cricket records
 List of England One Day International cricket records
 List of England Test cricket records
 List of England Twenty20 International cricket records
 List of India One Day International cricket records
 List of India Test cricket records
 List of India Twenty20 International cricket records
 List of New Zealand One Day International cricket records
 List of New Zealand Test cricket records
 List of New Zealand Twenty20 International Cricket records
 List of Pakistan One Day International cricket records
 List of Pakistan Test cricket records
 List of Pakistan Twenty20 International cricket records
 List of South Africa One Day International cricket records
 List of South Africa Test cricket records
 List of South Africa Twenty20 International cricket records
 List of Sri Lanka One Day International cricket records
 List of Sri Lanka Test cricket records
 List of Sri Lanka Twenty20 International cricket records
 List of West Indies One Day International cricket records
 List of West Indies Test cricket records
 List of West Indies Twenty20 International cricket records
 List of Zimbabwe One Day International cricket records
 List of Zimbabwe Test cricket records
 List of Zimbabwe Twenty20 International cricket records

Other
 List of players who have scored 10,000 or more runs in Test cricket
 List of bowlers who have taken 300 or more wickets in Test cricket
 List of players who have scored 10,000 or more runs in One Day International cricket
 List of bowlers who have taken 300 or more wickets in ODI cricket
 List of bowlers who have taken a wicket with their first ball in international cricket
 List of batsmen who have scored 100 centuries in first-class cricket
 List of first-class cricket quadruple centuries
 List of women's international cricket hat-tricks
 List of cricketers who have taken five-wicket hauls on ODI debut
 List of ODI cricket centuries scored on debut
 List of One Day International cricket hat-tricks
 List of One Day International cricket hat-tricks taken on debut
 List of highest individual scores in ODIs
 List of One Day International cricket double centuries
 List of Test cricket triple centuries
 Variations in published cricket statistics

See also
 New Zealand cricket team records
 Pakistan cricket team records

Cricket records and statistics